Edison Alexánder López Gil (born 20 October 1999) is a Colombian footballer who plays as a midfielder for Envigado.

References

External links
 

Living people
1999 births
Association football midfielders
Colombian footballers
Categoría Primera A players
Envigado F.C. players
Sportspeople from Antioquia Department